Gary Wayne Lewis (born December 30, 1958) is a former American football tight end. Lewis was selected in the second round by the Green Bay Packers out of the University of Texas at Arlington in the 1981 NFL Draft. He played high school football at Dangerfield High School. Lewis's brother, Darryl, also played in the National Football League (NFL).

References

External links
NFL.com player page

1958 births
Living people
People from Mount Pleasant, Texas
American football tight ends
Texas–Arlington Mavericks football players
Green Bay Packers players
American football wide receivers